St. Johns High School is a public school located in St. Johns, Michigan, United States. It is within Clinton County.

Demographics 
The demographic breakdown of the 950 students enrolled in 2018–19 is:

 Male: 51.2%
 Female: 48.8%
 Native American: 0.8%
 Asian: 0.8%
 Black: 0.9%
 Hispanic: 6.8%
 White: 87.5%
 Multiracial: 3.1%

In addition, 23.4% of students were eligible for free or reduced-price lunch.

Athletics
St. Johns' athletic teams are known as the Redwings.  They compete in the Capital Area Activities Conference. The school colors are red and black.  The following MHSAA sports are offered at St. Johns:

Baseball (boys)
Basketball (boys & girls)
Competitive cheer (girls)
Cross country (boys & girls)
Football (boys)
Golf (boys & girls)
Boys State Champions 2016, 2017
Gymnastics (girls)
Ice hockey (boys)
Soccer (boys & girls)
Softball (girls)
Swimming and diving (boys & girls)
Tennis (boys & girls)
Track (boys & girls)
Boys state champion – 1926
Girls State Champions – 2015
Wrestling (boys)
State Champion – 2010–2013

Notable alumni
Chad Finley, racing driver
Oliver Lyman Spaulding, U.S. Army brigadier general
Shane Houghton, co creator of Big City Greens.
Chris Houghton, co creator of Big City Greens.

References

External links
 

Schools in Clinton County, Michigan
High schools in Michigan